Eupalindia is a genus of moths of the family Erebidae. The genus was described by Schaus in 1914.

Species
Eupalindia magnifica Schaus, 1904
Eupalindia rubrescens Schaus, 1904

References

Calpinae